Jakes Corner or Jake's Corner may refer to:

Places 
 Jakes Corner, Yukon, Canada
 Jakes Corner, Arizona, United States

Other uses 
 Jake's Corner (film)